The Donna Lee Bakery murders occurred on the night of Saturday, October 19, 1974, in New Britain, Connecticut. Six people were found murdered inside the bakery. At the time, it was the worst mass murder in Connecticut history. Two local men were convicted of the murders: Ronald F. "Tiny" Piskorski, a 25‐year‐old former bar bouncer and circus‐bear wrestler, and Gary B. Schrager, a 31‐year‐old drifter.

Murders 

During the slayings, the bakery owner, a store clerk, three customers, and a young passer‐by who had stopped in to ask directions were shot in the back of the head after they were forced to lie face down on the floor of a back room at the Donna Lee Bakery.

Authorities had initially suspected robbery as the motive for the killings, and believed that both Piskorski and Schrager took part in the murders. Investigators later theorized that one of the victims had recognized Schrager during the robbery, and the perpetrators thus felt the need to eliminate all witnesses. Michael P. Kron, age 49, one of the victims, was related to Schrager as his uncle by marriage. Schrager felt that Kron had recognized him and would be able to identify him.

Victims 

The six victims included:

 John Salerni, age 55  Salerni owned the business and had named the bakery for his beloved daughter, Donna Lee Salerni (a 19-year-old college freshman at the time of the murders).
 Helen Giansanti, age 59
 William J. Donohue, Jr., age 27
 Mr. Thomas Dowling
 Mrs. Thomas Dowling
 Michael P. Kron, age 49

Of the six victims found dead at the scene of the crimes, one, John Salerni, had been slain by a shotgun blast; each of the others was killed by a bullet.

Perpetrators 

Piskorski was found guilty of the murders at his trial in December 1975. Because the capital punishment was not available at that time, he was sentenced to 150 years to life in prison. 

Schrager's trial began late in 1976. He halted proceedings early to plead guilty to four of the six slayings. In a strange confession, Schrager admitted that both he and Piskorski had gone to the bakery to rob it. Schrager said he never shot anyone, but he would not name the killer. Schrager stated only that "someone" had gone into the back of the bakery and he heard several shots. Schrager was sentenced to 20 years to life in prison for being an accessory to murder. He attempted to gain parole several times, despite the strenuous objections of victims' families. The state parole board ruled in 1997 that he will never be set free.

Incarceration 

Currently, Piskorski, age , is incarcerated in a Maine prison. Schrager, age , is located in a Minnesota penitentiary.

See also 

 Capital punishment in Connecticut
 Crime in Connecticut
 Lorne J. Acquin (19502015), another Connecticut mass murderer

References

External links 

 2 Charged With Slaying of 6 in Bakery, The New York Times, November 22, 1974

 A Grisly Night At New Britain's Donna Lee Bakery, The Hartford Courant, April 02, 2014

 State v. Piskorski, State of Connecticut v. Ronald Piskorski, Supreme Court of Connecticut, 177 Conn. 677 (1979)

1974 crimes
1974 in Connecticut
1974 in the United States
1974 murders in the United States
Crimes in Connecticut
Mass murder in the United States
Massacres in the United States
Murder in Connecticut
October 1974 crimes